Roman Panin may refer to:

 Roman Ivanovich Panin (1897 - 1949), Soviet military general
 Roman Petrovich Panin (b. 1989), Russian footballer